Arnulfo Cordero Alfonzo (born 25 November 1955) is a Mexican politician affiliated with the Institutional Revolutionary Party. As of 2014 he served as Deputy of the LX Legislature of the Mexican Congress representing Chiapas.

References

1955 births
Living people
Institutional Revolutionary Party politicians
21st-century Mexican politicians
People from Comitán
Deputies of the LX Legislature of Mexico
Members of the Chamber of Deputies (Mexico) for Chiapas